Mark Wallington may refer to:

Mark Wallington (footballer) (born 1952), English football goalkeeper
Mark Wallington (writer) (born 1953), author and broadcaster